The sand sole (Pegusa lascaris) is a fish species in the family Soleidae.

Widespread in the northeastern and southeastern Atlantic, to the Gulf of Guinea in the south, also in the Mediterranean Sea. Recorded in the Suez Canal. During a long time the soles from the Black Sea and Sea of Azov were erroneously identified as  the Blackhand sole, which was considered as subspecies P. l. nasuta (now as a different species). The modern studies confirms the presence of the sand sole in this water basin.

References

External links
 

sand sole
Fish of the East Atlantic
Fish of the Mediterranean Sea
Fish of the Adriatic Sea
Fish of the Black Sea
Marine fauna of West Africa
Marine fauna of North Africa
Marine fish of Europe
sand sole